Chudoba  (German Kudoba) is a village in the administrative district of Gmina Lasowice Wielkie, within Kluczbork County, Opole Voivodeship, in south-western Poland.

The village has a population of 790.

Notable residents
 Bernhard Jagoda (1940-2015) German politician

References

Chudoba